Stoatley Rough School was a school founded in 1934 by Dr Hilde Lion in Haslemere in England.  It was for Jewish children who were refugees from Germany, helping them acclimatise to British education.  Bertha Bracey – an organiser of the Quaker Germany Emergency Committee – found a donor for the school building, chaired the board of governors from 1938 to 1945 and continued as a governor of the school until 1960 when the school closed. Dr. Emmy Wolff taught German literature and became second in command at the school in 1937.

References

Further reading

Defunct schools in Surrey
Educational institutions established in 1934
1934 establishments in England
Educational institutions disestablished in 1960
1960 disestablishments in England
Jewish schools in England